The 40th Day after death is a traditional memorial service, family gathering, ceremony and ritual in memory of the departed on the 40th day after his or her death.  The observation of the 40th day after death occurs in Islam and the Eastern Orthodox tradition.  The ritual represents spiritual intercession on the part of the dead, who are believed to collectively await the Day of Judgment. Thus, these rituals may be conducted for an individual, like commemoration of the 40th day after death, or for all dead souls.

See also 
 Memorial service in the Eastern Orthodox Church
 Arbaʽeen Commemoration the 40th day after the martyrdom of Husayn ibn Ali (Shia Islam)
 :ja:四十九日 (gathering of family and relatives of, and praying for a person in Japan, 49 days after the person dies)

Notes

References
 

Rituals
Death customs